The Israeli Operations Directorate (Agaf HaMivtza'im) is a branch in the General Staff of the Israel Defense Forces, established in 1999, alongside the regional commands, the air force and navy. Since June 2021, it is headed by Aluf .

Tasks
The directorate has the following responsibilities:
 Preparing the IDF for war, emergencies, and day-to-day security
 Deriving an operational strategy from the national security agenda and military doctrine
 Coordinating the IDF's work with the other security forces, and drafting IDF recommendations for the political echelon
 Instructing the regional command, air force, navy, GOC Army Headquarters and other directorates, with respect to the exercise of force and its coordination

Units
 Operations Division
 Instruction, Doctrine and Evaluation Division
 IDF Spokesperson 
 Special Means Division
 Department for Campaign Design  
 Centre for Consciousness Operations
 Inspection and Supervision Department
 General Staff Security Department

Commanders 
The list includes those who served as heads of operations prior to when it was spun off from the IDF's General Staff. The list also includes pre-IDF Haganah commander Yigael Yadin who also served in that capacity during the 1948 Arab–Israeli War. Dan Halutz, who original served as the Aide to Chief of the Operations Branch, was appointed to the head of the Operations Directorate soon after its establishment.

Assistant Head of the Operations Branch  
The list is of those who served as Assistant Head of the Operations Branch prior to establishment of the Operations Directorate in 1999.

References

See also
Directorate of Operations (CIA)

Military units and formations of Israel
Israel Defense Forces directorates